The 23rd annual Hypo-Meeting took place on May 31 and June 1, 1997 in Götzis, Austria. The track and field competition featured a decathlon (men) and a heptathlon (women) event.

Men's Decathlon

Schedule

May 31

June 1

Records

Results

Women's Heptathlon

Schedule

May 31

June 1

Records

Results

Notes

See also
1997 World Championships in Athletics – Men's decathlon
1997 World Championships in Athletics – Women's heptathlon

References
 decathlon2000
 decathlonfans
 1997 Year Ranking Decathlon

1997
Hypo-Meeting
Hypo-Meeting